The 104th Pennsylvania House of Representatives District is located in South Central Pennsylvania and has been represented since 2023 by Dave Madsen.

District profile
The 104th Pennsylvania House of Representatives District is located in Dauphin County and Lebanon County. It includes Clemson Island Prehistoric District. It is made up of the following areas:

 Dauphin County
 Dauphin
 East Hanover Township
 Halifax
 Halifax Township
 Jackson Township
 Jefferson Township
 Middle Paxton Township
 Millersburg
 Penbrook
 Reed Township
 Dauphin County (continued)
 Rush Township
 Susquehanna Township
 Swatara Township (PART) 
 District 04
 District 07
 Upper Paxton Township
 Wayne Township
 Lebanon County
 East Hanover Township
 North Annville Township

Representatives

Recent election results

References

External links
District map from the United States Census Bureau
Pennsylvania House Legislative District Maps from the Pennsylvania Redistricting Commission.  
Population Data for District 104 from the Pennsylvania Redistricting Commission.

Government of Dauphin County, Pennsylvania
Government of Lebanon County, Pennsylvania
104